The World Vengeance Tour was a 1982 concert tour by English heavy metal band Judas Priest where they toured throughout North America from 26 August 1982 until 21 February 1983 in support of the 1982 album Screaming for Vengeance.

Overview
The 12 December 1982 show was filmed and released on multiple video formats; first released on VHS, Beta, VHD and LaserDisc as Judas Priest Live in 1983; as Disc 5 as a DVD on the Metalogy compilation box-set in 2004; and as a separate DVD package entitled Live Vengeance '82 in 2006.

Even though the last United States leg of the tour ended in Honolulu on 21 February 1983, the band would perform their last show of the tour at the 1983 US Festival in San Bernardino, California on 29 May 1983 alongside Quiet Riot, Mötley Crüe, Ozzy Osbourne, Triumph, the Scorpions, and Van Halen. The band's performance is featured as a DVD on the 30th anniversary edition of Screaming for Vengeance.

Personnel
 Rob Halford – Lead vocals
 Glenn Tipton – Lead/rhythm guitar and background vocals
 K.K. Downing – Rhythm/lead guitar and background vocals
 Ian Hill – Bass 
 Dave Holland – Drums and background vocals

Setlist
The typical setlist for the tour consisted of:

"The Hellion" (Taped intro)
 "Electric Eye"
 "Riding On The Wind"
 "Heading Out to the Highway"
 "Metal Gods"
 "Bloodstone"
 "Breaking the Law"
 "Sinner"
 "Fever" (Dropped after 28 August 1982)
 "Desert Plains"
 "The Ripper"
 "Diamonds & Rust" (Joan Baez cover)
 "Devil's Child"
 "Screaming for Vengeance"
 "You've Got Another Thing Comin'"
 "Victim of Changes"
 "Living After Midnight"
 "The Green Manalishi (With the Two Prong Crown)" (Fleetwood Mac cover)
 "Hell Bent for Leather"
Also occasionally played were:
 "Tyrant" (Played on 29 August 1982 and 9 January 1983)
 "Hot Rockin'" (Played on 28 October 1982)
 "Genocide" (Played on 28 October 1982)

Tour dates

This show was supported by The Rods
This show was supported by Krokus
This show was supported by Iron Maiden
This show was supported by Coney Hatch
This concert was supported by Uriah Heep
This concert was supported by Heaven

Boxscore

References

Judas Priest concert tours
1982 concert tours
1983 concert tours